Bubblehead may refer to:

US military slang for a submariner
Booey Bubblehead is a character in the cartoon series Galaxy High
"Bubblehead", a hidden track from Feeder's album Yesterday Went Too Soon
"Bubble Heads", an episode of the animated television series O'Grady

See also
Bobblehead